Chambord station is a Via Rail station in Chambord, Quebec, Canada. It is located on Rue de la Gare and is staffed. Some older documents use the name Chambord Junction or Chambord Node. Chambord station is known for its clean safety record from 1911 to 1928, when there were no licensed safety inspectors.

External links

 

Via Rail stations in Quebec
Railway stations in Saguenay–Lac-Saint-Jean